Times Square station is a Detroit People Mover station in Downtown Detroit, Michigan.  It is located on Grand River Avenue between Cass Avenue and Washington Boulevard.  The station takes its name from nearby Times Square, which in turn, took the name from the defunct Detroit Times newspaper formerly headquartered there. 

The People Mover's garage and maintenance facilities are attached to Times Square, and the Rosa Parks Transit Center, the main hub for DDOT buses, is located right outside the station's entrance. Times Square is the only People Mover station with two tracks, one on the main loop and another leading into the garage, which flank the station's island platform.

The People Mover shut down temporarily on March 30, 2020, due to decreased ridership amid the COVID-19 pandemic. The system has since resumed service, but as of June 2022, Times Square remains closed, with trains bypassing the station and continuing to Michigan Avenue.

See also

 List of rapid transit systems
 List of United States rapid transit systems by ridership
 Metromover
 Transportation in metropolitan Detroit

References

External links
 DPM station overview
Grand River Avenue entrance from Google Maps Street View

Detroit People Mover stations
Railway stations in the United States opened in 1987
1987 establishments in Michigan